Ida Township is a civil township of Monroe County in the U.S. state of Michigan. The population was 4,964 at the 2010 census.  The township was organized in 1837 and named after local civic leader Ida M. Taylor.

Communities
The community contained its own railway station. The station served as an intersection that linked the Ann Arbor Railroad and New York Central lines. Federman had its own post office briefly from June 22, 1899 to August 31, 1906.
The community of Ida was listed as a new census-designated place for the 2020 census.
In 1853, Henry West came to the township and purchased a large plot of land in what would become the community of Lulu. A post office began operating in Lulu on June 29, 1880 with storekeeper Paul Nill as the first postmaster, and it operated until July 15, 1941. The railway line continues to run through the community and is operated by the Ann Arbor Railroad but no longer contains a station or stop in the community. The community also contains the Lulu Cemetery with the earliest grave dating back to 1855.
Yargerville contained its own post office from 1890–1906.

Geography

Demographics
As of the census of 2000, there were 4,949 people, 1,622 households, and 1,373 families residing in the township. The racial makeup of the township was 98.48% White, 0.14% African American, 0.16% Native American, 0.20% Asian, 0.51% from other races, and 0.51% from two or more races. Hispanic or Latino of any race were 1.25% of the population.

There were 1,622 households, out of which 41.7% had children under the age of 18 living with them, 75.2% were married couples living together, 5.6% had a female householder with no husband present, and 15.3% were non-families. 12.4% of all households were made up of individuals, and 5.4% had someone living alone who was 65 years of age or older.  The average household size was 3.03 and the average family size was 3.32.

In the township the population was spread out, with 29.5% under the age of 18, 8.1% from 18 to 24, 29.0% from 25 to 44, 25.2% from 45 to 64, and 8.3% who were 65 years of age or older.  The median age was 36 years. For every 100 females, there were 105.2 males.  For every 100 females age 18 and over, there were 102.8 males.

The median income for a household in the township was $57,106, and the median income for a family was $60,990. Males had a median income of $46,130 versus $28,456 for females. The per capita income for the township was $21,074.  About 1.9% of families and 2.6% of the population were below the poverty line, including 1.7% of those under age 18 and 4.4% of those age 65 or over.

Education
The majority of the township is served by Ida Public Schools, which has all three schools within one campus near the center of the community of Ida along Lewis Avenue.  The district also serves a small area of several neighboring townships.  A small portion of the western portion of Ida Township is served by Summerfield Schools in Summerfield Township to the west.

Previously, St. Anthony School of the Roman Catholic Archdiocese of Detroit was in Temperance. Its service area included Ida Township.

Images

References

Sources

Townships in Michigan
Townships in Monroe County, Michigan
1837 establishments in Michigan
Populated places established in 1837